Jack Stewart may refer to:

Jack Stewart (actor) (1913–1966), Scottish actor
Jack Stewart (artist) (1926–2005), American artist
Jack Stewart (diver), New Zealand diver
Jack Stewart (ice hockey) (1917–1983), Canadian ice hockey player
Jack Stewart (New South Wales politician) (1910–1972), Australian state politician
Jack Stewart (Western Australian politician) (1912–1998), Australian state politician
Jack Stewart (soccer) (born 1983), American soccer player
Jack Stewart (hotelier) (born ????), sports writer, publicist, hotelier, founder of Camelback Inn.
Jack Stewart (Oklahoma politician)

See also
Jackie Stewart (disambiguation)
Jack Stewart-Clark (born 1929), British politician
John Stewart (disambiguation)
Jackson Stewart (disambiguation)